Below is a list of current New Zealand swimming records as ratified by the national governing body, Swimming New Zealand.

Long course (50 m)

Men

Women

Mixed relay

Short course (25 m)

Men

Women

Mixed relay

Notes

References
General
New Zealand Long Course Records 10 February 2023 updated
New Zealand Short Course Records 10 February 2023 updated
Specific

External links
Swimming New Zealand web site

New Zealand
Records
Swimming records
Swimming